Elżbieta Krysińska (28 January 1928 – 3 December 2018) was a Polish athlete. She competed in the women's shot put at the 1952 Summer Olympics.

References

External links
 

1928 births
2018 deaths
Athletes (track and field) at the 1952 Summer Olympics
Polish female shot putters
Olympic athletes of Poland
Place of birth missing